Phasianella solida, common name the solid pheasant, is a species of sea snail, a marine gastropod mollusk in the family Phasianellidae.

Description
The size of the shell varies between 8 mm and 32 mm. Protoconch is smooth and the shell is brilliant, long, thin and turban-shaped, usually pale brown, reddish or pinkish, marked with variable blotches. It shows four-five rounded whorls. The operculum is white, oval-shaped.

(Description of Phasianella aethiopica) The height of the shell varies between 12 mm and 35 mm. The thick, solid shell has a pointed-ovate shape. The 5–6 whorls are moderately convex, sloping below the sutures. The oblique, ovate aperture is about half the length of shell. The thickened columella has a heavy white or rosy callus, and is subdentate near the posterior angle of the aperture. The color of the shell is light brown or rose, with revolving series of arrow-shapeci or irregular flecks of lighter shade, or with longitudinal oblique light stripes extending downward to middle of body whorl. The apex and the base of the shell are stained with rose color.

(Description of Phasianella variegata Lamarck, 1822) The solid shell grows to a height of 2 cm and has an ovate-conic shape. Its pointed, conic spire is higher and more acute than the spire of Phasianella nivosa. The five, somewhat convex whorls are separated by well marked sutures and are somewhat flattened above. The rather small aperture is short ovate, and measures less than half the length of the shell. It is widely rounded below, and angular above. The columella has a flattened callus. The parietal wall has a more or less white callus, and is decidedly thickened near the posterior angle. The color of the shell is variable, often pale with reddish-brown and white dashes and blotches. It is usually flesh tinted, ashen or brown, more or less clouded with darker and lighter shades, and flammulated with dark and light below the sutures, spirally traversed by narrow hair-like lines of brown or red, interrupted by white dots and intervals. The white is sometimes predominate.

Distribution
This quite common species occurs in the Red Sea, in the Indian Ocean off Madagascar, Tanzania and the Mascarene Basin; off the Aldabra Atoll;in the tropical Indo-West Pacific: off southern Australia, the Philippines, off Java and Japan. It lives at intertidal depths up to 15 m.

References

 Dautzenberg, Ph. (1929). Contribution à l'étude de la faune de Madagascar: Mollusca marina testacea. Faune des colonies françaises, III(fasc. 4). Société d'Editions géographiques, maritimes et coloniales: Paris. 321–636, plates IV-VII pp.
 Spry, J.F. (1961). The sea shells of Dar es Salaam: Gastropods. Tanganyika Notes and Records 56
 Robertson, R. 1985. Archaeogastropod biology and the systematics of the genus Tricolia (Trochacea: Tricoliidae) in the Indo-West Pacific. Monographs of Marine Mollusca 3: 1–103. page(s): 20
 Drivas, J. & M. Jay (1988). Coquillages de La Réunion et de l'île Maurice
 Bosch D.T., Dance S.P., Moolenbeek R.G. & Oliver P.G. (1995) Seashells of eastern Arabia. Dubai: Motivate Publishing. 296 pp. 
 Wilson, B. (1993). Australian Marine Shells. Prosobranch Gastropods. Kallaroo, WA : Odyssey Publishing. Vol.1 1st Edn
 Taylor, J.D. (1973). Provisional list of the mollusca of Aldabra Atoll.

External links
  Odhner, N.H.J. (1919). Contribution a la faune malacologique de Madagascar. Arkiv för Zoologi, K. Svenska Vetenskapsakademien, 12(6): 1-52, 4 pl.

Sea Life Base

Phasianellidae
Gastropods described in 1778